Meganyctycia is a genus of moths of the family Noctuidae.

Species
Meganyctycia forcipata Hreblay & Ronkay, 1998

References
Natural History Museum Lepidoptera genus database
Meganyctycia at funet

Xyleninae